Brandon Campbell is an American music composer for film, TV and video games and is best known for his music contributions to TV series' like Game of Thrones and Person of Interest and movies such as The Thinning and The Great Wall. After graduating from the University of Rochester he interned at Hans Zimmer's studio, Remote Control Productions and later served as an assistant to Ramin Djawadi. Campbell ventured off on his own in with the film Where Love Found Me, and later that year wrote the music for the thriller The Thinning.

As an additional composer Campbell has written music for TV shows, films and video games like Breakout Kings (2011–2012), Medal of Honor: Warfighter (2012), The House of Magic (2013), Person of Interest (2011–2016), The Strain (2014–2017), Dracula Untold (2014), Warcraft (2016), Gears of War 4 (2016), Prison Break (2005–2017), A Wrinkle in Time (2018), The Ravine (2021) and Eternals (2021). In 2018, Campbell composed the score for the drama-comedy Funny Story. He co-composed the score for the film Slender Man with Ramin Djawadi, created additional music for Gears 5 and co-composed the second episode of Apple TV+'s series Amazing Stories with Djawadi.

Campbell is also composing music for Netflix's The Letter for the King. He also scored music for Pacific Rim: The Black, the anime series based on Pacific Rim and Pacific Rim: Uprising.

Campbell co-composed music for the Amazon Games video game New World and the Square Enix video game The Diofield Chronicle with Djawadi.

Campbell received an Daytime Emmy Award in 2021 for Music Direction and Composition for a Drama Series for NETFLIX’s The Letter for the King.

References

External links 
 Official Website

American male composers
University of Rochester alumni
Living people
American television composers
American film score composers
Video game composers
Year of birth missing (living people)